Kal Narges-e Karanj (also Romanized as Kal Narges-e Kāranj and Kal Narges-e Kārenj) is a village in Howmeh-ye Sharqi Rural District, in the Central District of Izeh County, Khuzestan Province, Iran. At the 2006 census, its population was 23, in 4 families.

References 

Populated places in Izeh County